Plasmodium molecular tools are a set of methods for the genetic manipulation of the parasite genus Plasmodium. Plasmodium species have been difficult to scientifically study, partially due to the inability of many standard biological techniques to genetically alter the organism.  Recent research has sought to overcome these technical barriers in order to make the parasite more amenable to study. Below is a description of published methods of genetic control within the Plasmodium parasite.

Transformation
 Electroporation
 loaded RBCs

DNA level

Transcription regulation
 Tet-based transactivator system - ligand-inducible control of gene transcription based upon the Tet system (P. falciparum)

Integration systems
 Rep20 mediated
 Bxb1 integrase - site-specific stable genetic integration into chromosomes mediated by mycobacteriophage Bxb1 integrase (P. falciparum)

Recombination systems
 Flp/FRT - induced site-specific recombination/mutagenesis using the yeast Flp/FRT system (P. berghei)

Transposon systems
 piggyBac - lepidopteran transposable element for random, efficient integration of DNA into genome (P. falciparum)

RNA level
 RNAi
 antisense
 self-cleaving ribozyme - A failed attempt to use an inducible self-cleaving ribozyme to control mRNA degradation of fused transcripts (P. falciparum)

Protein level
 FKBP destabilization domain - ligand (Shld1)-regulatable domain to promote degradation of fusion protein (P. falciparum)
 DHFR destabilization domain - ligand (Trimethoprim)-regulatable domain to promote degradation of fusion protein P. falciparum. By virtue of protein being tagged to a DHFR degradation domain from E. coli, as well as GFP and an HA-tag, protein levels can be regulated, cellular localization of the protein can be determined, and the protein can be purified from cultured parasites.

References 

Plasmodium molecular tools